WLCS (98.3 FM, "Classic Hits 98.3") is a radio station broadcasting a classic hits format. Licensed to North Muskegon, Michigan, it first began broadcasting under the WFMM call sign.

WLCS is a Cumulus Media station, airing local on-air hosts and broadcasts plus the network's Greatest Mojo ("Classic Rock & Roll") satellite feed.  98.3 WLCS is home to classic hits from three decades.  Hear from artists such as the Beatles, Fleetwood Mac, The Monkees, The Eagles, The Beach Boys, Chicago, Foreigner, and many of Motown's best.  
 
Program Schedule
WEEKDAYS
6a–9a:   Morning Fix w/ Jon Russell & Rick Hickman
9a–3p:   Timm Morrison
3p-8p:   Becky Shock
8p-1a:   Jay Fox
1a-6a:   Chuck Perks

SATURDAYS
Saturday Morning Jukebox w/ Jon Russell & Rick Hickman {6a-9a Saturdays}

SUNDAYS
9a-11a:  Breakfast with the Beatles   {Host: Dennis Mitchell}11a-1p:  The Classic Countdown Show   {Host: Dick Bartley}

SPECIALTY PROGRAMMING
High School Football/Basketball   {Jon Russell, Cal VanSingel & Rick Hickman}
Detroit Lions Football
WLCS Power Hour   {Jon Russell & Mike Taylor} (Wednesdays at 5pm)

STUDIO ADDRESS:
3375 Merriam   Suite 201
Muskegon Heights, MI  49444
(231)903-0405

Facebook:   WLCS
Twitter:    WLCSSports

References

Michiguide.com - WLCS History

External links

LCS
Classic hits radio stations in the United States
Muskegon County, Michigan
Cumulus Media radio stations
Radio stations established in 1985
1985 establishments in Michigan